Alan Viani was head of the Department of Research at DC37, the largest municipal union in New York City, from 1973 to 1985. He was later involved with resolving the 2005 NYC transit strike.

In 1965, Viani helped lead a strike by over eight thousand workers for the New York City Department of Welfare. The strike was largely successful, as it led to a clear statement of the rights of city employees to collective bargaining. It also led to the appointment of Victor Gotbaum as DC37's Executive Director.

Viani was later an assistant to DC37 Department of Research head Daniel Nelson, and took over the position after Nelson's death in 1973. He was DC37's lead negotiator in this role until 1985, when he joined the New York City Office of Collective Bargaining.

In 1993, he retired to become a mediator and arbitrator.
In 2005, Viani was part of a three-member mediation team that helped the two sides to resolve their differences in the 2005 New York transit strike.

In 2015, Viani was appointed as a neutral member to the New York City Board of Collective Bargaining.

References 

American trade union leaders
Living people
Year of birth missing (living people)